SL2 are an English breakbeat hardcore group from London, England. They also recorded, remixed or produced under the names Slipmatt & Lime and T.H.C.

Background
Starting out as a group of three, SL2 was originally a coming together of DJs Matt "Slipmatt" Nelson and John "Lime" Fernandez, and rap vocalist Jason "Jay-J" James. The SL2 name came from the founders' initials: Slipmatt (S) and Lime (L), and the fact that they were a duo, hence "SL2".

Underground
As youngsters in 1980s Britain, they were into hip-hop, before having their heads turned by the growing rave scene.

Their big break came in 1989 through Slipmatt's older brother, Paul Nelson, who was running the party-promoting organisation Raindance; they became the enterprise's resident DJs, playing parties all over the United Kingdom.

A year into touring with Raindance, SL2 released their debut single, "Do That Dance", through B-Ware Records.  Subsequently, SL2 set up their own Awesome Records label, through which they first released another single, "DJs Take Control".  The record sold 3500 copies, attracting the attention of new dance label XL Recordings.

Mainstream
XL Recordings catapulted SL2 into the mainstream charts by re-releasing "DJs Take Control" which became a number 11 hit in the UK Singles Chart.  More success followed accompanied by two female rave/breakbeat dancers, Jo Millett (who later produced her own music) and Kelly Overett (who would later go on to be a member of the Italian Eurodance act Cappella). The latter two appeared with Nelson, Fernandez and James in live shows and their videos.

"On a Ragga Tip" was released in 1992 through XL Recordings, and became their biggest hit to date, spending 11 weeks in the UK chart.  It peaked at number two, and was their first song to chart across Europe.  With new hit "Way in My Brain" charting later that year, disagreements within the group saw SL2 split up by the end of 1993.

Reformation
In 1997, a remix of their biggest hit, "On a Ragga Tip" re-entered the chart, leading Slipmatt and Lime to reconvene.  Although no new material was ever released, they still continue to DJ on a semi-regular basis. "On a Ragga Tip", was used in the opening ceremony, of the 2014 Commonwealth Games.

On 21 July 2015, The SL2 EP was released containing digitally remastered recordings of "On a Ragga Tip", "Way in My Brain", "DJs Take Control" and "The Noise".

Cover versions
South African band Dr Victor and the Rasta Rebels covered "On a Ragga Tip".

In 2015, the British electronic/house duo, My Digital Enemy, released an EDM remake of "On a Ragga Tip" which sampled the SL2 original version.

Discography

Singles and EPs

References

External links
SL2's Myspace page
Slipmatt's official homepage
DJ Slipmatt at Fantazia.org
DJ Slipmatt - Back to the Old Skool
SL2 discography at e.discogs
Can You Feel It Media

English dance music groups
English techno music groups
Hardcore techno music groups
Breakbeat hardcore music groups
English electronic music groups
Remixers
XL Recordings artists
Musical groups from London